"Rock 'n' Roll za kućni savet" is a single from influential Serbian and former Yugoslav rock band Riblja Čorba from their 1979 album Kost u grlu.

B-side features the song "Valentino iz restorana".

Track listing
 "Rock 'n' Roll za kućni savet" - 2:41
 "Valentino iz restorana" - 2:39

Personnel
Bora Đorđević - vocals
Rajko Kojić - guitar
Momčilo Bajagić - guitar
Miša Aleksić - bass guitar
Vicko Milatović - drums

References
 EX YU ROCK enciklopedija 1960-2006,  Janjatović Petar;  
 Riblja čorba,  Jakovljević Mirko;  

1979 singles
Riblja Čorba songs
Songs written by Bora Đorđević